William Herbert Adams (February 15, 1861 – February 4, 1954), better known as Billy Adams, was an American political figure who served as the 25th governor of the state of Colorado, from 1927 until 1933.

Biography 
Adams was born in Blue Mounds, Wisconsin. In 1878, when he was 17, Adams moved to Alamosa, Colorado. He was later elected to City Treasurer, then Mayor of Alamosa, and later as Conejos County commissioner.  In 1886, he was elected to the Colorado General Assembly as a member of the Colorado House of Representatives. In 1888, he was elected to the Colorado Senate where he served until 1926, when he was elected as Governor of Colorado.  The centennial historian of the state, Marshall Sprague, summarized Billy Adams as "a cheerful, outgoing, bowlegged cowboy."

In 1921, during his term as Colorado Senate Senator, Adams received approval on a bill that formed Alamosa State Normal School in Alamosa, Colorado.  The college’s name was later changed to Adams State Teachers College in honor of its founder and finally to its present name Adams State University.  Adams died on February 4, 1954, in Alamosa, Colorado, at the age of ninety-two, where he is buried.

Personal life 
John Adams, Billy's father, was a member of the Wisconsin State Assembly and the Wisconsin State Senate. Billy’s older brother, Alva Adams, was also governor of Colorado from 1887 to 1889, from 1897 to 1899, and 1905.  Billy's nephew, Alva Blanchard Adams, was a United States Senator from Colorado from 1923 until 1925 and from 1933 to 1941.

See also
Governor of Colorado
List of governors of Colorado

References

External links
The Governor William H. Adams Collection at the Colorado State Archives

Democratic Party members of the Colorado House of Representatives
County commissioners in Colorado
Democratic Party Colorado state senators
Democratic Party governors of Colorado
1861 births
1954 deaths
People from Blue Mounds, Wisconsin
People from Alamosa, Colorado